Pascal Gasunzu is a Burundian diplomat who became the Ambassador to China in 2011. He also serves as the non-resident diplomat for Japan and Vietnam.

References

Living people
Burundian diplomats
Ambassadors of Burundi to China
Ambassadors of Burundi to Japan
Ambassadors of Burundi to Vietnam
Year of birth missing (living people)